Volkovo is a rural locality (a village) in Dmitriyevsky Selsoviet, Ufimsky District, Bashkortostan, Russia. The population was 707 as of 2010.

Geography 
It is located 33 km from Ufa, 20 km from Dmitriyevka.

References 

Rural localities in Ufimsky District